Hope of the Broken World is the name of Selah's eighth studio album. The album was released August 23, 2011 by Curb.

Critical reception

James Christopher Monger of AllMusic writes, "Dove award-winning, contemporary gospel trio Selah have made a career out of mining the past and fusing it with the present, crafting new hymns that honor the classics, and bringing old hymns out of the shadows and into the light."

Timothy Yap reviews the album for Hallels and concludes, "Hope of the Broken World resembles a beautiful tapestry weaving together threads of different influences. But more importantly, these songs weave for us a picture of what it means to relate to God and how we are to love others."

In her review of the song, "Coat of Many Colors" for CCM Magazine Caroline Lusk remarks of the album, "The latest album from Selah is like a breath of fresh air. Not only for the listener…but for the group themselves."

Track listing

Track information and credits verified from the album's liner notes.

Charts

References

External links
Selah Official Site
Curb Records Official Site

2011 albums
Curb Records albums
Word Records albums
Selah (band) albums